Arctagrostis latifolia, the wideleaf polargrass, is a widespread species of grass (family Poaceae), with a circumpolar distribution in the high Arctic. It is a tetraploid with chromosome number 2n = 4x = 28.

References

Pooideae
Flora of Norway
Flora of Svalbard
Flora of Finland
Flora of North European Russia
Flora of East European Russia
Flora of Siberia
Flora of the Russian Far East
Flora of Kazakhstan
Flora of Mongolia
Flora of Alaska
Flora of Subarctic America
Flora of British Columbia
Flora of Manitoba
Flora of Ontario
Flora of Quebec
Flora of Labrador
Flora of Greenland
Plants described in 1852
Flora without expected TNC conservation status